John Edward "J. P." Prince (born July 14, 1987) is an American professional basketball player who recently played for Astoria Bydgoszcz. He played collegiately for the Arizona Wildcats and Tennessee Volunteers.

Professional career
Prince started his professional career in the 2010–11 season with Antalya Büyükşehir Belediyesi from Turkey. He averaged 15.8 points per game in the TBL.

In November 2011, Prince signed with the Chinese team Dongguan NewCentury Leopards from the CBA.

In March 2012, he was signed by Guaiqueríes de Margarita, a team based in La Asunción, Venezuela.

For the 2012–13 season Prince returned to Turkey when he signed with Mersin BB. He led the league in steals that season.

On October 10, 2014 he signed a contract with Polish team PGE Turów Zgorzelec. Prince averaged 16.4 points along with 5.6 rebounds per game for Turow. After the regular season he won the Polish League MVP award.

On July 17, 2014, he signed a one-year deal with Telenet Oostende.

On November 18, 2015, he signed with Cholet Basket of the French LNB Pro A. On March 9, 2016, he left Cholet and signed with Trabzonspor for the rest of the season.

On October 19, 2016, he signed with Azad University Tehran.

On March 4, 2017, Prince signed with Orléans Loiret Basket for the rest of the 2016–17 Pro A season.

On January 8, 2018, Prince signed a short-term deal with  French club Antibes Sharks. On February 13, 2018, he parted ways with Antibes after appearing in five games.

On July 12, 2019, Prince signed a short-term deal with  Polish club Astoria Bydgoszcz. On September 5, 2019, the club terminated the contract after Prince appearing in 2 test games.

Personal life
Prince is the cousin of NBA player Tayshaun Prince.

References

External links

Eurobasket.com profile
RealGM.com profile
Euroleague.net profile
Tennessee Volunteers bio

1987 births
Living people
American expatriate basketball people in Belgium
American expatriate basketball people in China
American expatriate basketball people in France
American expatriate basketball people in Iran
American expatriate basketball people in Poland
American expatriate basketball people in Turkey
American expatriate basketball people in Venezuela
American men's basketball players
Antalya Büyükşehir Belediyesi players
Arizona Wildcats men's basketball players
Astoria Bydgoszcz players
BC Oostende players
Cholet Basket players
Guaiqueríes de Margarita players
Olympique Antibes basketball players
Orléans Loiret Basket players
Mersin Büyükşehir Belediyesi S.K. players
Parade High School All-Americans (boys' basketball)
Shenzhen Leopards players
Shooting guards
Small forwards
Basketball players from Memphis, Tennessee
Tennessee Volunteers basketball players
Trabzonspor B.K. players
Turów Zgorzelec players